Euproctis lutea, the fresh-water mangrove itchy caterpillar, is a species of moth of the family Erebidae. It is found in northern Australia (the Northern Territory, Queensland and New South Wales) and New Guinea.

The wingspan of the adult moth is about 30 mm. The forewings are yellow with two faint zigzag lines, while the hindwings are plain yellow.

The larvae feed on Lycopersicum esculentum, Begonia species, Myosotis arvensis, Rosa odorata, Barringtonia acutangula and Planchonia careya. They are black and hairy, with a wide white line running along the length of the abdomen, and a wide white spot on the thorax. Full-grown larvae reach a length of about 15 mm, and their hairs can lead to intense itching after contact with human skin. Pupation takes place in a sparse cocoon in a sheltered location away from the food plant.

The moth was first described in European scientific literature by Johan Christian Fabricius in 1775.

References

Moths described in 1775
Lymantriinae
Taxa named by Johan Christian Fabricius